The United States Capitol Historical Society (USCHS) is an organization chartered by the United States Congress, beginning in 1962,  to educate the public on the heritage and history of the United States Capitol, as well as its institutions and those individuals who have served them over time.

History 
The Society was established in 1962 as a private non-profit organization.  Founded through a bipartisan effort by Congress, the society's creation was spearheaded by its first president, Representative Fred Schwengel of Iowa.  The group holds a congressional charter under Title 36 of the United States Code.  They have an Oral History collection at the Library of Congress.  They offer Fellowships to study the history of the Capitol.

Awards 
In 2004, The United States Capitol Historical Society was one of eight recipients of the National Humanities Medal from the National Endowment for the Humanities conferred by President George W. Bush. The following entry from the NEH website, 2004 Medal Recipients page, gives great insight into the operation, purpose and service of The United States Capitol Historical Society:

"Ronald Sarasin says that one of his favorite pastimes is leading special tours onto the House floor of the U.S. Capitol.

"There is so much more to be told about our nation's history from inside this building than simply the making of laws," says Sarasin, who was a congressman from Connecticut in the 1970s. He is now president and chief executive officer of the United States Capitol Historical Society, founded in 1962 by Congress to educate the public on the history of the Capitol and Congress.

On his tours, Sarasin is quick to point out the building's purpose. "It is not a museum, it is a working office building, and I remind people on tours of that--that they are walking through the halls and congressmen and senators are walking through the same halls as well.

"As a former member of Congress, you never lose your fascination for the Capitol Building or the floor itself," says Sarasin. "Our goal in the historical society is, as our founder Fred Schwengel said, to have people 'catch something of the fire that burned in the hearts of the men and women who served here.'"

In forty-two years the society has used its visitor center, books, films, lectures, and tours to provide an in-depth examination of this American icon. Fulfilling its mission has become more difficult because of security restrictions instituted after September 11, 2001—much of the Capitol is now closed off from public view and indoor tours are limited. Consequently, the society's guidebook, We the People, the Story of the United States Capitol, is more in demand than ever. It is published in six languages and is now in its fifteenth printing.

"We've even created an outdoor tour around the building to help visitors imagine what's going on inside," Sarasin says.

The society collects and displays documents and artifacts from the Capitol's history. Among its holdings are nineteenth-century handwritten records of the House and an antique coverlet depicting the Capitol in 1846 before the large dome and House and Senate wings were added. The society sponsors fellowships and internships on the art of the Capitol, the people who built it, and the lawmakers who inhabit it.

Since George Washington laid the cornerstone of the Capitol in 1792, the building has been built, burned, rebuilt, and restored. Ten architects and countless artisans contributed, including a Roman fresco painter named Constantino Brumidi. This year is the two hundredth anniversary of Brumidi's birth, and his work was featured this past September as part of the society's symposium on "The Fourth Rome: Roman and Italian Influences on the Art, Architecture, and Culture of Washington, D.C. and the U.S. Capitol." Brumidi had restored Raphael's work in the Vatican before he came to the United States in 1852. He worked on the Capitol for more than twenty-five years and at age seventy-five was still painting the frieze encircling the rotunda.

His successor was Allyn Cox, who completed the rotunda frieze in the 1950s and went on to decorate the corridors with a series of murals commissioned jointly by the society and the Daughters of the American Revolution. The "Hall of Capitols" shows all the buildings used by Congress, the construction of the current building, and key points in its history. The "Great Experiment" corridor depicts the growth of America in sixteen paintings and the third corridor displays the series "Westward Expansion."

The stories found in the Capitol are important to pass on to the next generation, Sarasin says. The society offers books and lesson plans geared towards different age groups and special tours for visiting school groups. "We take them to the House floor, let them sit in the seats of the legislators, and talk about the House and answer their questions," says Sarasin. "I always enjoy it because often these are the best and the brightest who come as representatives of their own states, and they bring a lot of knowledge, which challenges me."

Today 
The society is governed by a fifty-person Board of Trustees who have past involvement with the Capitol.

References

External links
United States Capitol Historical Society official site.
National Endowment for the Humanities official site, United States Capitol Historical Society 2004 National Humanities Medal Recipient page.

Organizations established in 1962
Historical Society
Historical societies of the United States
National Humanities Medal recipients
Patriotic and national organizations chartered by the United States Congress